Niqmepa, son of Idrimi, was king of Alalakh in the first half of 15th century BC.

Contemporary documents
Evidence for the reign of King Niqmepa is based on clay cuneiform tablets excavated at Tell Atchana by Charles Leonard Woolley.

References 

Kings of Alalakh
Yamhad dynasty
15th-century BC people